Quad 4 is the name of a family of principally DOHC inline four-cylinder engines produced by General Motors' Oldsmobile division between 1987 and 2002; a single SOHC version was built between 1992 and 1994. 

Its name was derived from the engine's four-valve, four-cylinder layout. Even though belts were more popular for this purpose on OHC engines at the time, chains were used to time the camshafts to the crankshaft. The water pump is also driven by the timing chain. 

The Quad 4 was the first wholly domestic regular production DOHC four-cylinder engine designed and built by GM; the only prior DOHC four-cylinder engine offered by GM was the Cosworth Vega, which featured a DOHC head designed by Cosworth in England. In addition to the  DOHC versions, there was also both a short-lived SOHC variant, the "Quad OHC", available from 1992 to 1994, and the  Twin Cam from 1996 to 2002.

All engines in the Quad 4 family were produced at the Lansing Engine Plant (plant five) in Delta Township near Lansing, Michigan. The Twin Cam was the last engine that was engineered and produced solely by Oldsmobile; the Aurora V8 and Shortstar V6 shared architecture with the Cadillac Northstar V8.

First released to the public as a regular production option for the 1988 Oldsmobile Cutlass Calais and Pontiac Grand Am, the engine's availability expanded to Buick in late 1988 and Chevrolet in 1990, after which it became a mainstay in GM's lineup until its cancellation after the 2002 model year. It was replaced by the Ecotec for the 2003 model year.

Reception
Simultaneous to the engine's release in 1988, Oldsmobile attempted to further the Quad 4 name through highly publicized events featuring such cars as the Oldsmobile Aerotech.  Another such event was the 1988 Indianapolis 500, when Oldsmobile was chosen to pace the race with a convertible version of their Cutlass Supreme, and a pre-production turbocharged Quad 4 was the engine of choice for their pace car. Although it was publicized in 1988 that the Quad 4 was forthcoming in a  "HO", as well as a  turbocharged version (the same engine that was in the pace car that year), GM never released the turbocharged version as a publicly available option. Although the engine in Oldsmobile Aerotech was a purpose-built, turbocharged example; it was solely meant to showcase the capability of the engine's design.

After the first few years of positive reviews of the Quad 4, the automotive press began to criticize it for its noise, vibration, and harshness (NVH) levels.  At the time, the Quad 4 was generally compared to turbocharged four cylinders, V6s, and occasionally V8s. The first changes of the Quad 4 to address its NVH were two rounds of exhaust port size reductions, followed by the addition of balance shafts in 1995. Further changes were made for the 1996 model year when the engine's bore and stroke were changed, and the engine was subsequently redubbed "Twin Cam".

In recent years, the design has gained a minor following in hot rodding circles as a period style engine because it looks similar to a 1930s Offenhauser DOHC design (once you remove the ribbed aluminum cover, exposing the tall "cam towers" and the deep valley between them holding the spark plugs).

Versions

LD2 

The  LD2 was the standard version of the Quad 4, introduced in 1987 for the 1988 model year.

The base Quad 4 saw several slight changes during its production run including different crankshafts, cams, and manifolds, all meant to increase torque and lessen the NVH. 

In an effort to yield 5 additional HP some highly opted 1992 RPO LD2 SC Oldsmobile Achievas received a vortex valve along the TB induction pipe runner with an injection molded auxiliary induction tube funneling cool air from outside the engine compartment to the airbox via the openings around drivers side headlight (ram/air replete with cold weather block off plate in radiator core support) as until the engine warmed up would cause stumbling issues with the MAF sensor. 

There was also a transitional version of the LD2 in 1995, with the same displacement as the early Quad 4 but featuring the dual balance shafts of the later quipped 2.4-liter LD9 Twin Cam.

Applications:
 1988–1991 Buick Skylark
 1992–1994 Oldsmobile Achieva
 1988–1991 Oldsmobile Cutlass Calais
 1990–1991 Oldsmobile Cutlass Supreme
 1988–1994 Pontiac Grand Am
 1990–1991 Pontiac Grand Prix
 1993–1997 Pontiac Trans Sport (Europe only)

1995 

For 1995 only, a balance shaft-equipped version of the  version was produced. This arrangement ensures a constant load on the shafts: the crank drives one shaft, which drives the second, which then drives the oil pump. The shafts spin at twice the engine rpm, forcing the redline to be reduced from 6800 to 6500 rpm. This was the only Quad 4 produced in 1995.

This was known as a transitional year for the engine family.

Applications:
 1995 Pontiac Sunfire GT
 1995 Chevrolet Cavalier Z24
 1995 Pontiac Grand Am
 1995 Oldsmobile Achieva
 1995 Buick Skylark

LG0 
Changes that differentiate the LG0 from the LD2 engine are more aggressive camshafts and an extra half point of compression; 9.5:1 to 10.0:1. These engines were recommended to run exclusively on premium fuel with a 91 octane rating or higher due to the compression ratio.

The high output engine was introduced with both a special production run of 200 Cutlass Calais International Series coupes, as well as 200 Grand Am SE coupes — all featuring bright red paint, and gray interiors. The LG0 engine was only available with the heavy-duty Getrag designed HM-282/NVG-T550 five-speed manual transmission.

From 1989 to 2009, the Quad 4 held the title of being General Motors' most powerful naturally aspirated regular production four-cylinder engine (with the exception of the 2.9L I4 Atlas engines used in 2007-2012 Chevrolet Colorados and GMC Canyons). Only recently was the LG0's  rating eclipsed when the 2010 model year  Ecotec LAF was launched in the Buick Lacrosse and Chevrolet Equinox. The LAF has a rated output of  but does so with an 11.4:1 compression ratio, gasoline direct injection and variable valve timing.

There was a limited production version of the LG0 engine offered in select Oldsmobiles which used the designation "W41" (listed below).

LG0 applications:
 1990–1993 Chevrolet Beretta GTZ
 1994 Chevrolet Beretta Z26
 1989–1991 Pontiac Grand Am SE
 1990–1991 Pontiac Grand Am LE with the "sport performance package" (RPO: W32)
 1992–1994 Pontiac Grand Am GT
 1989–1991 Oldsmobile Cutlass Calais International Series
 1990-1991 Oldsmobile Cutlass Calais Quad 442
 1992–1994 Oldsmobile Achieva SC
 1990 Oldsmobile Cutlass Supreme International Series

W41 

The W41 was the highest-output Quad 4. The additional  came from longer duration cams and a different PROM.
Part of the W41 drivetrain was a specific version of the HM-282/NVG-T550 with a gear set otherwise unavailable. All W41 five-speed transmissions had a final drive ratio (FDR) of 3.94:1 whereas the 1988–1992.5 LD2 and LG0 transmissions all used a 3.61:1 FDR; the 3.94:1 FDR was used on all 1992.5-1994 LG0 transmissions, but retained the standard HM-282/NVG-T550 gear set.

W41 applications:
 1991 Oldsmobile Cutlass Calais
 1992–1993 Oldsmobile Achieva SCX

L40 

A SOHC variant of the Quad 4 was intended to replace the Pontiac 2.5 L Tech IV OHV "Iron Duke" engine. Debuting in 1992, this Quad OHC was an eight-valve engine and produced ,  less than the Quad 4 of the same era.

Although power and fuel economy were better than the Tech IV, the Quad OHC was retired after 1994 when the DOHC version became standard.

Applications:
 1992–1994 Oldsmobile Achieva
 1992–1994 Pontiac Grand Am
 1992–1994 Buick Skylark

LD9 

The LD9 Twin Cam was a  Quad 4 variant with balance shafts, and a redesigned cylinder head which debuted in 1996. In the mid-nineties, these engines, like their earlier 2.3L counterparts, were known for timing chain failures, as well as water pump failures, in which the water pumps were often difficult and costly to access and replace. They also had very small oil passages, making for less than adequate lubrication, and costly engine repairs if not maintained properly. This engine received a minor update halfway through the 1999 model year that eliminated the exhaust gas recirculation, increased the compression ratio from 9.5:1 to 9.7:1, and switched from low impedance fuel injectors to high impedance. For increased reliability this engine also saw other minor updates in the 2000s towards the end of its use in General Motors vehicles. In 2001, changes included a smaller knock sensor, flat-top pistons instead of dished, new oiling passages, newer stronger timing chain, a newer-designed water pump, a redesigned starter motor and a higher capacity catalytic converter. An improved belt tensioner was introduced in 2002.

Specifications post-1999 

Applications:
 1996–2002 Chevrolet Cavalier Z24
 1996–2002 Pontiac Sunfire GT
 1996–2001 Pontiac Grand Am
 1996–1998 Oldsmobile Achieva
 1999–2001 Oldsmobile Alero
 1997–2000 Chevrolet Malibu
 1996–1998 Buick Skylark

Racing 

Applications:
Oldsmobile Aerotech

See also 

 List of GM engines

References

External links 
 Quad4Forums.com
 Yahoo group QuadFourm mailing list

Oldsmobile engines
Straight-four engines
Gasoline engines by model